The UAAP softball is only played in the Women's division. Softball in the UAAP started in 1953. However, there were years when the tournament was not held. It was not played in thirteen Seasons (1970–73 and 1985–95). Softball has not only made a comeback from its past hiatus, it has now more school participants than in baseball, its counterpart for the male athletes. There are currently seven teams participating in the softball tournament while baseball has only six.

UAAP softball champions

Number of championships by school
*School withdrew from the UAAP in Season 25 (1962-63)

See also
 NCAA Philippines Softball Championship

References

Softball
Softball competitions